Brian J. Boyle is a Scottish astrophysicist based in Australia since 1996. His primary research interests are in the fields of quasars, active galaxies and cosmology.

He has been involved in science-direction setting in Australia for over 15 years, contributing the mid-term review in 2000, leading the development of the Australian Astronomy Decadal Plan 2006-15 and facilitating the development of the Optical and Radio Astronomy Investment Plan for the National Collaborative Research Infrastructure Strategy in 2007.

He was awarded the Centenary Medal for services to Australian Astronomy in 2003 and elected as a fellow of the Australian Academy of Science in 2006.

Boyle is currently CSIRO SKA Director as well as the Project Director for the Australia–New Zealand SKA bid. In these roles he plays a major part both nationally and internationally in the Square Kilometre Array (SKA) program; a project to build the world's largest cm-wavelength radio telescope.

Education 
Boyle attended school at Stewart's Melville College in Edinburgh, Scotland. He obtained a BSc in astrophysics from the University of Edinburgh in 1982 and a PhD from the Durham University in 1986. His thesis title was "The evolution and clustering of optically selected quasi-stellar objects."

Career 
Boyle has held positions at the University of Edinburgh, as Director of the Australian Astronomical Observatory (1996 to 2003) and Director of CSIRO Australia Telescope National Facility (2003 to 2009) before his appointment to CSIRO SKA Director in February 2009.

Research 
Boyle has published more than 300 papers in astronomy, and has undertaken research programs on the:
 cosmological distribution of quasars
 clustering of faint galaxies
 nature of galaxies associated with distant quasars
 origin of the X-ray background
 nature of the faint radio source population.

In 2007, Boyle was a member of one of the two teams of scientists who shared the 2007 Gruber Cosmology Prize. The team was awarded the prize for their discovery that the expansion of the Universe is accelerating, leading to the idea of an expansion force, dubbed dark energy.

Awards (Since 2000) 
 January 2000: Appointed Adjunct Professor, University of NSW
 January 2001: Centenary Medal for "services to Australian astronomy"
 September 2005: Awarded Fellowship Australian Institute of Company Directors
 May 2006: Elected a Fellow of the Australian Academy of Science
 December 2006: Elected Honorary Fellow of the Royal Astronomical Society
 September 2007: 2007 Gruber Prize in Cosmology (shared)
 January 2013: Public Service Medal for "outstanding public service to Australian astronomy and for leadership of the Australian team bidding to host the international Square Kilometre Array facility".

See also 
 CSIRO
 Square Kilometre Array
 Australia Telescope National Facility
 Radio Astronomy

References

External links 
 Australia–New Zealand SKA Project (anzSKA)
 CSIRO
 CSIRO Astronomy and Space Science
 The International Square Kilometre Array Project
 Australian Astronomical Observatory
 Supernova Cosmology Project
 ATLAS

Living people
People educated at Stewart's Melville College
Fellows of the Australian Academy of Science
Recipients of the Centenary Medal
Fellows of the Australian Institute of Company Directors
Year of birth missing (living people)
Alumni of Durham University Graduate Society